The men's 3x3 wheelchair basketball tournament at the 2022 Commonwealth Games will be held in a temporary Games-time venue at the brownfield site in Smithfield between 29 July and 2 August 2022.

The discipline of wheelchair basketball made its sport debut at the Commonwealth Games.

Qualification
England qualified as host nation, two nations qualified by winning their respective IWBF zonal qualifiers, and the rest received Bipartite Invitations. Five of the six Commonwealth Games regions are represented.

Rosters

Competition format
Six teams were drawn into two groups. Upon completion of the group stage, the top two teams in each group advance to the semi-finals; the remaining two teams contest a match for fifth / sixth place.

Group stage
All times based on British Summer Time (UTC+01:00)

Group A

Group B

Knockout stage

Fifth place match

Semi-finals

Bronze medal match

Gold medal match

Final ranking

References

2022